The Beardmore W.B.V was a prototype British single-engine shipborne biplane fighter of World War I developed by Beardmore. It was not successful, only two being completed.

Development and design
At the same time as developing the Beardmore W.B.IV, G. Tilghman Richards, the chief designer of Beardmore, designed a second aircraft to meet an Admiralty requirement for a ship-borne fighter aircraft to be armed with a 37 mm Le-Puteaux quick firing gun in order to destroy airships. The resulting aircraft, the W.B.V, was a single seater two-bay tractor biplane powered by a 200 hp (149 kW) Hispano-Suiza engine.  The wings folded for storage on board ship. The manually loaded Le-Puteaux gun was mounted between the cylinder banks of the V-8 engine, firing through a hollow propeller shaft. Unlike the W.B.V, the W.B.IV was not fitted with a buoyancy chamber, being instead fitted with inflatable flotation bags.

The first prototype flew on 3 December 1917. During testing, the Le Puteaux gun was considered dangerous by RNAS pilots, and the aircraft was re-armed with a more conventional synchronised Vickers machine gun together with a Lewis gun mounted on a tripod mounting. Development was abandoned shortly after the completion of a second prototype.

Specifications

See also

References

 
 

1910s British fighter aircraft
W.B.V
Carrier-based aircraft
Aircraft first flown in 1917
Biplanes